The American Legion Hut in Tehlequah City Park, jct. of E Shawnee St. and N. Brookside Ave., in Tahlequah, Oklahoma was built in 1937 and was listed on the National Register in 2006.  It reflects WPA Standardized Style and is also known as Rhodes Pritchett American Legion Hut Post 50 and served as a meeting hall.

References

American Legion buildings
Buildings and structures completed in 1937
Buildings and structures in Tahlequah, Oklahoma
Clubhouses on the National Register of Historic Places in Oklahoma
Works Progress Administration in Oklahoma
WPA Rustic architecture
1937 establishments in Oklahoma
National Register of Historic Places in Cherokee County, Oklahoma